900s may refer to:

 900s (century) AD, the period from 900 to 999, a century in the first millennium of the Common Era, almost synonymous with the 10th century (901–1000)
 900s BC (century), a century in the first millennium Before Common Era
 900s (decade) AD, the period from 900 to 909, a decade in the first millennium of the Common Era, almost synonymous with the 91st decade (901-910).
 900s BC (decade), a decade in the first millennium Before Common Era

See also

 
 S900 (disambiguation)
 900 series (disambiguation)